The European route E5 in Spain is a series of roads, part of the International E-road network, running from the French border near Irun, via Madrid to Algeciras. The E5 originates in Scotland, travelling south to Southampton where it crosses the English Channel to the French city of Le Havre. Via Paris and Bordeaux it reaches the Spanish border near Hendaye.

Route 
The E5 in Spain starts at the French border in Irun, Basque Country, arriving from the A63 autoroute from Bordeaux and Bayonne. It follows the AP-8 to the major city San Sebastián until Eibar. In Eibar, the E5 turns south towards the AP-1 going to the Basque capital Vitoria-Gasteiz. After crossing the small Treviño enclave, it crosses the border with Castile and León towards Burgos. After Burgos, the road goes further south through the arid regions of central Spain, arriving in the Spanish capital Madrid. The E5 uses the eastern part of the Madrid Ring Road M-40, passing the Adolfo Suárez Madrid–Barajas Airport. South of Madrid, near Getafe, the E5 follows the A-4 highway going south. The road enters the sparsely populated Castilla–La Mancha region, where it passes both of the major cities Toledo and Ciudad Real about 50 km to the east. In Southern Spain, the border with Andalusia is crossed in the Despeñaperros national park. At Bailen, there is an important junction with the E902 towards Granada and Málaga. The E5 goes southwest passing Córdoba to end at the capital of Andalusia and the major city Seville, passing the city on the east. The A-4 transforms into the AP-4 towards the city of Jerez de la Frontera and the coastal city Cádiz. South of Cádiz, the E5 uses the A-48 highway and the N-340 road close the Atlantic coast, passing the most southern point of Europe in Tarifa, to end at the port city of Algeciras, just across Gibraltar. The E5 passes five regions (Basque Country, Castile and León, Madrid, Castilla–La Mancha and Andalusia) as well as 10 provinces. The E5 is a toll road from Irun to Eibar on the Autopista AP-8 and on the Autopista AP-1 from Eibar to Vitoria-Gasteiz and from Miranda de Ebro to Burgos. They are all open toll systems. Although the Autopista AP-4 from Seville to Cádiz should be a toll road, it is not in practice. The E5 covers a total distance of 1.221 km (759 mi) in Spain.

Detailed route

References 

International E-road network in Spain
Roads in Spain